Karakol (Kara-Kool) is a rural locality (a selo) and the administrative centre of Karakolskoye Rural Settlement, Ongudaysky District, the Altai Republic, Russia. The population was 411 as of 2016. There are 6 streets.

Geography 
Karakol is located 17 km northwest of Onguday (the district's administrative centre) by road. Kurota is the nearest rural locality.

References 

Rural localities in Ongudaysky District